Frances Morris may refer to:

 Frances Morris (actress) (1908–2003), American actress
 Frances Morris (gallerist) (born 1959), director of the Tate Modern

See also
Francis Morris (disambiguation) for male version of the name